Héctor Leonardo Páez León (July 10 of 1982 in Ciénega (Boyacá, Colombia). Is a Colombian cross-country mountain biker. He came 26th at the 2008 Summer Olympics, while at the 2012 Summer Olympics, he competed in the Men's cross-country at Hadleigh Farm, finishing in 28th place.

During 2019 he win for the 5th time the Sella Ronda Hero (Dolomites), and win for the first time the Monterosa Prestige Marathon (Aosta Valley).

He become the UCI Mountain Bike Marathon World Champion in 2019 and 2020.

References

External links

Official Site

Colombian male cyclists
Cross-country mountain bikers
1982 births
Living people
Olympic cyclists of Colombia
Cyclists at the 2008 Summer Olympics
Cyclists at the 2012 Summer Olympics
Sportspeople from Boyacá Department
Pan American Games medalists in cycling
Pan American Games gold medalists for Colombia
Central American and Caribbean Games gold medalists for Colombia
South American Games gold medalists for Colombia
South American Games medalists in cycling
Cyclists at the 2011 Pan American Games
Cyclists at the 2019 Pan American Games
Competitors at the 2010 South American Games
Competitors at the 2014 Central American and Caribbean Games
Central American and Caribbean Games medalists in cycling
Medalists at the 2011 Pan American Games
UCI Mountain Bike World Champions (men)
21st-century Colombian people